Maryevka is a rural locality (a village) in Kazadayevsky Selsoviet, Sterlitamaksky District, Bashkortostan, Russia. The population was 56 as of 2010. There are 11 streets.

Geography 
Maryevka is located 10 km northwest of Sterlitamak (the district's administrative centre) by road. Kazadayevka is the nearest rural locality.

References 

Rural localities in Sterlitamaksky District